Milakokia Lake is a  lake in Newton Township, Mackinac County, Michigan. Milakokia Lake is the headwaters for the Milakokia River, which flows from the lake into Lake Michigan. The Milakokia Lake Management Area borders the lake and surrounding areas. The Management Area consists of 14,387 acres of state-owned land in Schoolcraft and Mackinac Counties. There is a large limestone quarry to the west of the lake.

See also 
 List of lakes in Michigan

References

Lakes of Michigan